The All Japan Ice hockey Championship (全日本アイスホッケー選手権大会) is an annual ice hockey tournament for Japanese teams, that began in 1930, making the tournament one of the oldest sporting competitions in the country.

The tournament, organized by the Japan Ice Hockey Federation, is an open competition for professional (Japan has four Asia League teams), amateur, and university teams from around the country (limited berths for each region).  It is usually played during one week in February in a pre-designated city, with a single-elimination tournament.

All Japan Ice Hockey champions

See also
Asia League Ice Hockey
Japan Ice Hockey League
All-Japan Women's Ice Hockey Championship

References
 jihf.or.jp

External links
 Japan Ice Hockey Federation
 2013 Tournament Scores jihf.or.jp

Ice hockey competitions in Japan
Recurring sporting events established in 1930